Reithrodon is a genus of rodent in the family Cricetidae. 
It contains the following living species:
 Bunny rat (Reithrodon auritus)
 Naked-soled conyrat (Reithrodon typicus)

The scientific name translates as "channel tooth" and refers to grooves on the upper incisors. The oldest fossils date from the late Pliocene, about four million years ago. The immediate ancestors of the genus may have evolved as the southern regions of South America became increasingly arid around the end of the Miocene.

References

External links 
 Tree of Life: Reithrodon

 
Rodent genera
Taxonomy articles created by Polbot